The India women's national baseball team is a national team of India and is controlled by the Amateur Baseball Federation of India. It represents the nation in women's international competition. The team is a member of the Baseball Federation of Asia. 

In 2004, India participated in the Women's Baseball World Series. The team was also scheduled to participate in the 2004 Women's Baseball World Cup but withdrew before the tournament. India made its debut in the Women's Baseball World Cup in 2008.

Women's Baseball World Cup

Women's Baseball Asian Cup

See also
 India national baseball team
 Baseball in India

References

Women's national baseball teams
Baseball in India
Base